Erigeron atticus is a European species of flowering plant in the family Asteraceae. It is native to France, Spain, Italy, Switzerland, Austria, Germany, Poland, Czech Republic, Slovakia, Bulgaria, the former Yugoslavia, Hungary, and Romania.

Erigeron atticus is an herb up to 60 cm (2 feet) tall. One plant usually produces several flower heads, each with white, blue or purple ray florets surrounding many yellow disc florets.

References

atticus
Flora of Europe
Plants described in 1788